Tephritis angustipennis is a species of tephritid or fruit flies in the genus Tephritis of the family Tephritidae.

Distribution
Scandinavia South to Belgium, Switzerland & Bulgaria, East to Kazakhstan, USA, Canada.

References

Tephritinae
Insects described in 1844
Diptera of North America
Diptera of Europe